The Hotel and Restaurant Workers' Union (GGA) was a trade union representing hospitality workers in Austria.

The union was founded by the Austrian Trade Union Federation in 1945.  By 1977, it had 21,484 members.  The following year, it merged with the Personal Service Workers' Union, to form the Hotel, Catering and Personal Services Union.

Presidents
1945: Karl Komenda
1955: Ferdinand Nothelfer
1956: Fritz Sailer

References

Hospitality industry trade unions
Trade unions established in 1945
Trade unions disestablished in 1978
Trade unions in Austria
1945 establishments in Austria
1978 disestablishments in Austria